Kullervo Leskinen (15 September 1908 – 25 July 1989) was a Finnish sports shooter. He competed at the 1948 Summer Olympics and 1952 Summer Olympics.

References

External links
 

1908 births
1989 deaths
People from Toholampi
People from Vaasa Province (Grand Duchy of Finland)
Finnish male sport shooters
Olympic shooters of Finland
Shooters at the 1948 Summer Olympics
Shooters at the 1952 Summer Olympics
Sportspeople from Central Ostrobothnia